Congo Airlines was an airline based in the Democratic Republic of the Congo. In 1998, it merged with Zaire Airlines and Zaire Express to form Hewa Bora Airways.

Code data
IATA code: EO
ICAO code: ALX
Callsign: ALLCONGO

See also		
 Transport in the Democratic Republic of the Congo

References

Defunct airlines of the Democratic Republic of the Congo
Airlines disestablished in 1994